John Nelson Darby (18 November 1800 – 29 April 1882) was an Anglo-Irish Bible teacher, one of the influential figures among the original Plymouth Brethren and the founder of the Exclusive Brethren. He is considered to be the father of modern Dispensationalism and Futurism. Pre-tribulation rapture theology was popularized extensively in the 1830s by John Nelson Darby and the Plymouth Brethren, and further popularized in the United States in the early 20th century by the wide circulation of the Scofield Reference Bible.

He produced translations of the Bible in German "Elberfelder Bibel", French "Pau" Bible, Dutch New Testament, and English (finished posthumously) based on the Hebrew and Greek texts called The Holy Scriptures: A New Translation from the Original Languages by J. N. Darby. It has furthermore been translated into other languages in whole or part.

Biography

Early years
John Nelson Darby was born in Westminster, London, and christened at St. Margaret's on 3 March 1801. He was the youngest of the six sons of John Darby and Anne Vaughan. The Darbys were an Anglo-Irish landowning family seated at Leap Castle, King's County, Ireland, (present-day County Offaly). He was a nephew of Admiral Henry D'Esterre Darby who served with Lord Nelson at the Battle of the Nile, and it was in recognition of this family connection that John was given his middle name.  

Darby was educated at Westminster School and Trinity College Dublin where he graduated Classical Gold Medallist in 1819. Darby embraced Christianity during his studies, although there is no evidence that he formally studied theology. He joined an inn of court, but felt that being a lawyer was inconsistent with his religious belief. The future Bishop of Meath and evangelical Joseph Singer tutored him at Trinity. He, therefore, chose ordination as an Anglican clergyman in Ireland, "lest he should sell his talents to defeat justice". In 1825, Darby was ordained deacon of the established Church of Ireland and the following year as priest.

Middle years
Darby became a curate in the Church of Ireland parish of Delgany, County Wicklow, and distinguished himself by persuading Roman Catholic peasants in the Calary district within this parish to abandon the Catholic Church. The well-known gospel tract "How the Lost Sheep was Saved" gives his personal account of a visit he paid to a dying shepherd boy in this area, painting a vivid picture of what his work among the poor people involved. He later claimed to have won hundreds of converts to the Church of Ireland. However, the conversions ended when William Magee, the Anglican Archbishop of Dublin, ruled that converts were obliged to swear allegiance to George IV as the rightful king of Ireland.

Darby resigned his curacy in protest. Soon afterwards, in October 1827, he fell from a horse and was seriously injured. He later stated that it was during this time that he began to believe that the "kingdom" described in the Book of Isaiah and elsewhere in the Old Testament was entirely different from the Christian church.

Over the next five years, he developed the principles of his mature theology – most notably his conviction that the very notion of a clergyman was a sin against the Holy Spirit, because it limited the recognition that the Holy Spirit could speak through any member of the Church. During this time (1827–28) he joined an interdenominational meeting of believers (including Anthony Norris Groves, Edward Cronin, J. G. Bellett, and Francis Hutchinson) who met to "break bread" together in Dublin as a symbol of their unity in Christ. By 1832, this group had grown and began to identify themselves as a distinct Christian assembly. As they travelled and began new assemblies in Ireland and England, they formed the movement now known as the Plymouth Brethren.

It is believed that John Nelson Darby left the Church of Ireland around 1831. He participated in the 1831–33 Powerscourt Conference, an annual meeting of Bible students organized by his friend, the wealthy widow Lady Powerscourt. At the conference, Darby publicly described his ecclesiological and eschatological views, including the pre-tribulation rapture. For about 40 years William Kelly (1821–1906) was his chief interpreter and continued to be a staunch supporter until his own death. Kelly in his work John Nelson Darby as I knew him stated that "a saint more true to Christ's name and word I never knew or heard of".

Darby defended Calvinist doctrines when they came under attack from within the Church in which he once served. His biographer Goddard states, "Darby indicates his approval of the doctrine of the Anglican Church as expressed in Article XVII of the Thirty-Nine Articles" on the subject of election and predestination. Darby said:

Later years

Darby travelled widely in Europe and Britain in the 1830s and 1840s, and established many Brethren assemblies. He gave 11 significant lectures in Geneva in 1840 on the hope of the church (L'attente actuelle de l'église). These established his reputation as a leading interpreter of biblical prophecy. America did not embrace Darby's ecclesiology as it did his eschatology, which is still being propagated (in various forms) at such places as Dallas Theological Seminary, and by authors and preachers such as Hal Lindsey and John Hagee.

In 1848, Darby became involved in a complex dispute over the proper method for maintaining shared standards of discipline in different assemblies that resulted in a split between Open Brethren, which maintained a congregational form of government and Exclusive Brethren. After that time, he was recognized as the dominant figure among the Exclusives, who also came to be known as "Darbyite" Brethren. He made at least 5 missionary journeys to North America between 1862 and 1877. He worked mostly in New England, Ontario, and the Great Lakes region, but took one extended journey from Toronto to Sydney by way of San Francisco, Hawaii, and New Zealand. A Geographical Index of his letters is currently available and lists where he travelled. He used his classical skills to translate the Bible from Hebrew and Greek texts into several languages. In English, he wrote a Synopsis of the Bible and many other scholarly religious articles. He wrote hymns and poems, the most famous being, "The Man of Sorrows", (not to be confused with "Man of Sorrows, What a name" by Philip Bliss (1838-1876)). He was also a Bible commentator. His writings were collected in his lifetime and published from January 1866 as "The Collected Writings of J. N. Darby"; there were 32 volumes published – two per year 1866–81 and two more soon after. He translated the Bible with the help of various brethren in different countries into German, French and English. He declined, however, to contribute to the compilation of the Revised Version of the King James Bible even though the revisers consulted Darby's work.

He died 1882 in Sundridge House, Bournemouth and is buried in Bournemouth, Dorset, England.

Darby is noted in the theological world as the father of "dispensationalism", whose eschatology was adopted and later made popular in the United States by Cyrus Scofield's Scofield Reference Bible.

Charles Henry Mackintosh, 1820–1896, with his popular style spread Darby's teachings to humbler elements in society and may be regarded as the journalist of the Brethren Movement. Mackintosh popularised Darby more than any other Brethren author. In the early twentieth century, the Brethren's teachings, through Margaret E. Barber, greatly influenced the Little Flock or Church Assembly Hall of Watchman Nee and Witness Lee.

Darby has been credited with originating the pre-tribulational rapture theory wherein Christ will suddenly remove His bride, the Church, from this world to its heavenly destiny before the judgments of the tribulation. Thus the prophetic program resumes with Israel's earthly destiny. Dispensationalist beliefs about the fate of the Jews and the re-establishment of the Kingdom of Israel put dispensationalists at the forefront of Christian Zionism, because "God is able to graft them in again," and they believe that in His grace he will do so according to their understanding of Old Testament prophecy. They believe that, while the ways of God may change, His purposes to bless Israel will never be forgotten, just as He has shown unmerited favour to the Church, He will do so to a remnant of Israel to fulfil all the promises made to the genetic seed of Abraham.

Criticism
Charles Haddon Spurgeon, Pastor of the Metropolitan Tabernacle and contemporary of Darby, published criticism of Darby and Brethrenism. His main criticism was that Darby and the Plymouth Brethren rejected the vicarious purpose of Christ's obedience as well as imputed righteousness. He viewed these of such importance and so central to the Gospel that it led him to publish this statement about the rest of their belief in the Sword and Trowel.

James Grant wrote: "With the deadly heresies entertained and taught by the Plymouth Brethren, in relation to some of the most momentous of all the doctrines of the Gospel, and to which I have adverted at some length, I feel assured that my readers will not be surprised at any other views, however unscriptural and pernicious they may be, which the Darbyites have embraced and zealously seek to propagate"

Works 
 The Holy Bible a new translation by J.N. Darby, a parallel edition, Bible Truth Publishers: Addison, Illinois.
 The Writings of J. N. Darby courtesy of Stem Publishing
 The Holy Scriptures (A New Translation from the Original Languages by J. N. Darby) courtesy of Stem Publishing
 A Letter on Free Will by J.N. Darby, Elberfeld, 23 October 1861
 The Collected Writings Of J. N. Darby, Ecclesiastical No. 1, Volume 1: The Character Of Office In The Present Dispensation
 The Watching Servant, Words of Truth: Belfast, Northern Ireland

See also
 Benjamin Wills Newton, former friend of Darby who clashed with Darby on doctrine and practice, which led to the Exclusive Brethren – Open Brethren division
 Cyrus I. Scofield
 Darby Bible
 Dispensationalism
 Eschatology
 Rapture
 Exclusive Brethren
 Fundamentalist Christianity
 List of people educated at Westminster School
 Miles J. Stanford
 Plymouth Brethren
 Robert Anderson (Scotland Yard) (1841–1918), Dispensational author, lawyer, British intelligence officer and London CID chief, in charge during Jack the Ripper murders.
 Watchman Nee

References

Sources
 
 
 
 Kelly, William. John Nelson Darby – as I knew him. Words of Truth: Belfast, Northern Ireland.

External links

 My Brethren, a biography of J. N. Darby
 The writings of John Nelson Darby
 Darby & Other Resources
 
 
 L’Attente actuelle de l’église et prophéties qui établissent la vérité du retour personnel du sauveur, exposées en onze soirées à Genève, (1840)
 Bible translated by John Nelson Darby
 J.N. Darby's Early Years 
 Correspondence between Darby and Rev. James Kelly of the Church of England – 5 megabytes
 Papers of John Nelson Darby – Archive of Darby's personal papers at the University of Manchester Library, Manchester, England
 Writings by J. N. Darby and his contemporaries
 Roy A. Huebner: Historian regarding J. N. Darby, early Brethren, their theology, and dispensationalism
 Synopsis of the Books of the Bible by John Nelson Darby

1800 births
1882 deaths
19th-century evangelicals
19th-century translators
Alumni of Trinity College Dublin
British Plymouth Brethren
Christian fundamentalists
English evangelicals
Irish Plymouth Brethren
People buried at the Wimborne Road Cemetery, Bournemouth
People educated at Westminster School, London
People from Westminster
Plymouth Brethren
Premillennialism
Translators of the Bible into English